Cabadbaran, officially the City of Cabadbaran, is a sixth class component city and de jure capital of the province of Agusan del Norte, Philippines. According to the 2020 census, it has a population of 80,354 people.

It is founded in 1894, the city rose from its Spanish period beginnings to become the premier town of Agusan del Norte. Its rich cultural heritage is evident in its preserved colonial period houses and its archaeological collections.

On August 16, 2000, the seat of provincial government was transferred from Butuan to Cabadbaran through Republic Act 8811, although the provincial government still holds office in Butuan, pending the actual transfer of provincial offices to the new capital. Cabadbaran was officially declared a city in 2007.

History

Spanish period 
Traces of 12th century villages can be found near the waterways that pass through the territory of Cabadbaran. No records are found before the Spanish colonization except for a site in Sanghan where Chinese ceramics from 15th to 16th century were found.

Cabadbaran was first mentioned by the Spanish as a small village chosen by the Spanish authorities to be turned into a reduction called "La Reunion de Cabarbaran" in 1867. The reduction was mostly populated by people from Southern Agusan. Then in 1879, the reduction was disbanded. The inhabitants of the reduction went back to their places of origin while the remaining migrated to Tubay.

In 1880–1881, the reduction was revived by Father Saturnino Urios, but was named Tolosa to honor Father Urios' hometown in Spain. In 1880, Tolosa was headed by the Teniente del Barrio Don Eduardo Curato. He petitioned to the Spanish authorities for the township application of Tolosa to be approved. On January 31, 1894, the petition was approved. The population and the economy grew, which was driven by agriculture and commerce. But the growth suddenly came to a halt when the revolution against Spain started. No significant turmoil affected the city until the coming of the American forces in 1901.

American period 
When the Americans arrived, Spanish forces were forced to surrender. Included with them was Capt. Andres Atega. Under the Americans, the town was called again as Cabadbaran (according to Don Andres Atega's proposal).

In 1903, the public education system was established with George Bohner as the first American teacher. Public health also improved when Dr. Pedro Malbas was appointed as the Public Health Officer in the 1920s and constructed sanitary toilets, deep wells and drainage canals. Public infrastructure was also improved by the Americans.

Then in the 1935 Constitutional Convention, Apolonio "Oyok" D. Curato, a lawyer, represented Agusan. He then became the Governor and Congressman of the province of Agusan.

The local economy grew when it started producing abaca from coconut plantations established by the Americans. Rice was also grown and remained as staple crop grown in the fields up to this day. The Agusan-Surigao road opened in the 1930s and several bus lines started public service along this route.

World War II
Cabadbaran had been occupied at one time by those resisting the Japanese occupation of Mindanao. Eventually the Japanese occupied it. On January 17, 1945, combined American and Filipino troops including recognized guerrillas fought a force of Japanese troops on the road between Cabadbaran and Butuan. The Japanese were in the process of reinforcing their garrison at Butuan. The guerrillas retreated when Japanese reinforcements arrived. The guerrillas also had depleted their ammunition.

On March 31, 1945, Major Juan Rivera and a guerrilla detachment attacked the Japanese at Cabadbaran; the Japanese abandoned the post after an hour-long battle.

The general headquarters of the Philippine Commonwealth Army and Philippine Constabulary was active on 1945 to 1946 in Cabadbaran during and aftermath of World War II.

Cityhood

On July 28, 2007, the municipality Cabadbaran becomes a city in the province of Agusan del Norte after ratification of Republic Act 9434.

The Supreme Court declared the cityhood law of Cabadbaran and 15 other cities unconstitutional after a petition filed by the League of Cities of the Philippines in its ruling on November 18, 2008. On December 22, 2009, the cityhood law of Cabadbaran and 15 other municipalities regain its status as cities again after the court reversed its ruling on November 18, 2008. On August 23, 2010, the court reinstated its ruling on November 18, 2008, causing Cabadbaran and 15 cities to become regular municipalities. Finally, on February 15, 2011, Cabadbaran becomes a city again including the 15 municipalities declaring that the conversion to cityhood met all legal requirements.

After six years of legal battle, in its board resolution, the League of Cities of the Philippines acknowledged and recognized the cityhood of Cabadbaran and 15 other cities.

Geography
Cabadbaran lies 9 degrees north latitude and 125 degrees and 30 minutes east longitude in the northeastern part of Mindanao.

Its boundaries are Tubay and Santiago to the north, Butuan Bay to the west, Magallanes and R. T. Romualdez to the south, and Sibagat, Agusan del Sur to the east.

It is generally flat with rolling hills and swamplands in its western part.

Climate

The city belongs to the Second Climatic Type of the Corona Classification. No definite dry season in the place and maximum rainfall occurs from October to January.

Barangays 
Cabadbaran is politically subdivided into 31 barangays.

Demographics

Language 
The entirety of Cabadbaran speaks Cebuano. There are also significant number of people who speak Surigaonon, for these people have lived or have ancestries from the northern municipalities and speak in a variety of the Jabonganon, Mainitnon and Gigaquitnon dialects of the Surigaonon language. Hiligaynon, Waray, Manobo languages, Butuanon, Boholano dialect and Maranao have also less significant speakers in the area while English and Filipino are also widely used spoken.

Economy

Cabadbaran produces several agricultural crops such as rice, corn, coconut, abaca, banana, and mango. The city has the biggest area planted with coconuts in Agusan del Norte with 18.46% of the total land area planted with the crop.

The Cabadbaran also has a booming economy based on agro industry, commerce and trade, source of several export and industrial products; it has also varied ecotourism destinations ranging from Caraga's highest peak, mile long tunnels to adventure tourism sites.

Tourism 

Like the popular destinations situated on neighboring provinces, Cabadbaran experiences a growing ecotourism industry. Annual climbs to reach Caraga's highest peak Mt. Hilong-Hilong (2,012 meters above sea level) has been organized by trekkers and mountaineers, there are also organized climbs to Mt. Mas-ai, a plateau located in Putting Bato which has a mountain top lake. Locals have also put up white water tubing adventures along Cabadbaran River including rappelling at some of the steep falls located at the foot of Mt. Hilong-hilong. Mt. Pongkay, which is a hill that can be seen from the city proper, can be a great destination for families who wants to experience the value of the Holy Week's penance and devotion. It is also a destination for mountain climbers and for those people who wants to see the panoramic view of Agusan del Norte and Butuan Bay.

Cabadbaran also has cheap inland pools by local residents that is an alternative to inland resorts. Many of these pools have sprouted through the years because of Cabadbaran's abundant fresh water which the city is known for. The city is also a beach destination for people from neighboring municipalities because of its crystal clear water and gray sandy beaches. The city has multiple hotels as well like Loreta's, Gazebo, and Casa Alburo.

Although Cabadbaran does not yet have any mainstream fast food restaurants, the city has various restaurants that offers Filipino, Japanese, and Chinese cuisine, an alternative to people who wants to have their fine dining locally than in the neighboring Butuan.

Culture

Festivals and celebrations
 Charter Day Celebration - held annually every July 28 to commemorate the cityhood of Cabadbaran.
 Dagkot Festival - It is the sole important event during the fiesta celebration of Cabadbaran City. The weeklong festivity features socio-civic activities, sporting events, trade fairs and capped by a grand street dancing parade and competition to celebrate the historic past and the bright future that awaits the city also in honor of Nuestra Seniora de Candelaria.
 Musikainan Food and Music Festival - It is a celebrational tribute to the city's "culture and history as well as the local's cooking tradition".

Government

Provincial Seat of Government
After the Provincial Government of Agusan del Norte attain the reclassification of their land conducted by the Dept. of Agriculture (DA) in Barangay Sanghan, Cabadbaran City where the new Capitol building will be constructed, the land conversion by the Department of Agrarian Reform (DAR) will soon follow. It will feature a modern design, including an employees village at the back of the new building intended for the provincial employees.

List of mayors 
The list of mayors that took office in Cabadbaran starting in 1896.

Transportation

By land
Cabadbaran City is accessible by bus from Bachelor Express, Davao Metro Shuttle, or Surigao Bus via Butuan-Surigao routes or vice versa. There are also vans, jeep and multi-cabs that have routes towards both Surigao City and Butuan which are stationed in the City Transport Terminal.

By air and sea
Currently the city has no sea and airports. Cabadbaran can be reached by air from Manila and Cebu via Butuan which is 30 kilometers away. From the Visayas, it can be accessed via the Nasipit Municipal Port in Nasipit, Agusan del Norte (60 km) or via the Lipata Port and Verano International Port both in Surigao City (79 km) through the Maharlika Highway

Education 

There are the list of the different schools within the city of Cabadbaran.

Public elementary schools 

 Alfonso B. Dagani Elementary School
 Ansili Elementary School
 Antonio C. Dagani Elementary School
 Antonio Luna Elementary School
 Bay-ang Elementary School
 Bayabas Elementary School
 Caasinan Elementary School
 Cabadbaran South Central Elementary School
 Cabinet Elementary School
 Calamba Elementary School
 Calibunan Elementary School
 Comagascas Elementary School
 Concepcion Elementary School
 Dagnasay Elementary School
 Del Pilar Central Elementary School
 Francisco C. Jongko Elementary School
 Katugasan Elementary School
 La Union Elementary School
 Lusong Elementary School
 Masundong Elementary School
 North Cabadbaran Central Elementary School
 Palidan Elementary School
 Pirada Elementary School
 Puting Bato Elementary School
 Soriano Elementary School

Secondary education

Public secondary and senior high schools 
 Cabadbaran City National High School
 Calamba National High School
 Del Pilar National High School
 Francisco C. Jongko National High School
 La Union National High School
 La Union Senior High School (Stand Alone)
 North Cabadbaran Central Elementary School Integrated School (Evening Opportunity High School)
 Puting Bato National High School

Public integrated schools 
 Chief Justice Ramon Avancena Integrated School
 Mahaba Integrated School
 Sanghan Integrated School

Private schools 

 Agape Christian Academy
 Bishop Haden Institute, Inc.
 Cabadbaran City Baptist Academy, Inc.
 Candelaria Institute of Technology of Cabadbaran, Inc.
 Mindanao Institute
 Montessori de Cabadbaran
 Northern Mindanao Colleges Inc.
 Oaktree Christian Preschool Inc.
 Rafael A. Mondejar Memorial College
 Rainbow Speechworld Learning Center, Inc.
 St. Aloysius Learning Center of Cabadbaran, Inc
 Tolosa Christian School, Inc.
 Trailblazer Study Center, Inc.
 Zion Children's Day Care Center

Tertiary education

Private colleges 
 Northern Mindanao Colleges Inc.
 Candelaria Institute of Technology of Cabadbaran, Inc.
 Rafael A. Mondejar Memorial College

Public university 
 Caraga State University - Cabadbaran Campus

Notable personalities

 Soledad Duterte - a Filipino teacher and activist, known as the mother of President Rodrigo Duterte
 Edelmiro Amante - former Executive Secretary, Congressman, Assemblyman and Presidential Consultant for Mindanao Flagship Projects
 Erlpe John Amante - former Governor and former Representative. In 2014, he was awarded as Outstanding Filipino Achiever in Public Service by the Golden Globe Annual Awards for Business Excellence
 Maria Angelica Rosedell Amante - born in Cabadbaran City, current Representative and former governor

Sister cities
 Makati, Philippines
 Naga, Cebu, Philippines
 Rizhao, China
 Batac, Philippines

References

External links

 [ Philippine Standard Geographic Code]

Cities in Agusan del Norte
Provincial capitals of the Philippines
Populated places established in 1894
1894 establishments in the Philippines
Component cities in the Philippines